Fashion Designer: Style Icon is a game for the Nintendo DS, developed by French studio Creative Patterns and published by 505 Games. It was released on 9 November 2007.

Story 
The player takes the role of a young woman who wants to take over the fashion industry, starting as an apprentice in a small fashion workshop.

Gameplay 
Initially the player must tailor clothes to meet given specifications ("missions") using the stylus, working through the stages of cutting out, sewing and ironing up to sewing the buttons. The goal is to create "stunning outfits" for clients. After each mission, the player presents the creations in catalogues, on movie posters, and on the catwalk, and must select models and hairstyles for the presentations.  Player performance is rated according to tailoring time, fashion choices, and accuracy as the player attempts to advance his or her career on the way to becoming the world's most famous fashion designer.

External links 
 Fashion Designer: Style Icon page

505 Games games
2007 video games
Simulation video games
Nintendo DS games
Nintendo DS-only games
Video games developed in France
Single-player video games